Buteh Gaz (also Romanized as Būteh Gaz) is a village in Jamrud Rural District, in the Central District of Torbat-e Jam County, Razavi Khorasan Province, Iran. At the 2006 census, its population was 115, in 28 families.

References 

Populated places in Torbat-e Jam County